Justinian was launched in 1787 at Rotherhithe as a West Indiaman. Between 1789 and 1791 she served as a storeship, carrying provisions to the convict settlement at New South Wales. From there she sailed to China via Norfolk Island. She returned to England from China.

Career
Justinian first appeared in Lloyd's Register (LR) in 1790 with Maitland, master, Hamilton, owner, and trade London–Botany Bay.

Transport to NSW and EIC voyage
Justinian left England on 29 July 1789 for Jamaica. She arrived there, unloaded her cargo, loaded a cargo of sugar, and returned to England. There the government hired her to carry stores to New South Wales. She had left for Jamaica on the same day that  left for Port Jackson, carrying convicts.

Captain Benjamin Maitland sailed Justinian on 29 December 1789, and she left Falmouth, England, on 20 January 1790, bound for New South Wales and China. After calling at Madeira and St Jago, she arrived at Sydney Cove in Port Jackson on 20 June, having been driven off from the harbour heads on 2 June. She had arrived at the Sydney Heads one day before Lady Juliana and only ill winds had prevented her from entering.

One week after Justinians arrival, the three ships of the infamous Second Fleet arrived. After unloading, she departed for China on 28 July 1790, to load tea for the EIC for the return journey to Britain.

Justinian arrived at England on 8 October 1791. She then returned to the West Indies trade. She was last listed in Lloyd's Register in 1796.

Citations and references
Citations

References
 

 

Cargo ships of the United Kingdom
Ships of the Second Fleet
1787 ships
Ships built in Rotherhithe
Age of Sail merchant ships